The 2007 Croatia Open Umag was the 18th occurrence of the Croatia Open Umag tennis tournament, held on July 23–29.

Seeds
Champion seeds are indicated in bold text while text in italics indicates the round in which those seeds were eliminated.

Draw

Finals

References

 
Croatian Open